The Court Theatre is a small theatre located in a Victorian building on the edge of the Pendley Manor estate at Tring in Hertfordshire, UK. The building was once the  estate stables and was later a riding school.  It was established in 1978. It presents a full programme of events throughout the year, from drama to musical performance. It is owned by David Evans MBE. The Theatre has now reopened following easing of restrictions due to COVID 19

References

Theatres in Hertfordshire
Tring